The 1969–70 Detroit Red Wings season is noted as being Carl Brewer's comeback season in the NHL. Brewer was reunited with former Toronto Maple Leafs teammates Bob Baun, Pete Stemkowski, and Frank Mahovlich. Brewer signed a contract worth $120,000. Brewer was acquired back in March 1968. The Detroit Red Wings acquired Frank Mahovlich, Pete Stemkowski, Garry Unger and Brewer's rights from Toronto in exchange for Floyd Smith, Norm Ullman, and Paul Henderson. Another important aspect of the season was that Gordie Howe had finally learned how badly treated he was financially by Wings management. Howe was always under the impression that he was the highest paid player on the team. Howe discovered that Bobby Baun was making over $100,000 per season while Howe was paid only $45,000 per season. After this information, Howe confronted management and demanded that he received the appropriate compensation.

Offseason
Former Red Wings' defenceman Doug Barkley was appointed as the head coach of the Fort Worth Wings of the Central Hockey League, which continued to be operated as Detroit's top farm team during the 1969–70 season.

NHL Draft

Regular season
Two games into the season, Bill Gadsby was released from his coaching duties.

On February 21, 1970, Brewer had one of his best games of the season. In a contest against his former club, the Toronto Maple Leafs, Brewer had 2 assists in the game and was named the third star of the game.

Final standings

Schedule and results

Player statistics

Regular season
Scoring

Goaltending

Playoffs
Scoring

Goaltending

Note: GP = Games played; G = Goals; A = Assists; Pts = Points; +/- = Plus-minus PIM = Penalty minutes; PPG = Power-play goals; SHG = Short-handed goals; GWG = Game-winning goals;
      MIN = Minutes played; W = Wins; L = Losses; T = Ties; GA = Goals against; GAA = Goals-against average;  SO = Shutouts;

Awards and records
 Carl Brewer, NHL Second Team All-Star 
 Gordie Howe, NHL First Team All-Star
 Frank Mahovlich, NHL Second Team All-Star

Playoffs
The Red Wings have made it into the playoffs for the first time since 1966.  They lost the Quarter-finals by getting swept by Chicago in 4 games in a best of seven series, or 0–4.

References
Red Wings on Hockey Database

 

Detroit
Detroit
Detroit Red Wings seasons
Detroit Red
Detroit Red